Achsah Guibbory is an American academic currently serving as the Ann Whitney Olin Professor of English at Barnard College. Her primary areas of focus are seventeenth century literature, religious history, and the works of both John Donne and John Milton; she has served as president of both the John Donne Society and the Milton Society of America.

Career
After studying at Indiana University, which awarded her a BA in 1966, Guibbory gained both an MA and a PhD from the University of California, Los Angeles, completing her studies in 1970. She then moved to the University of Illinois at Urbana–Champaign as an assistant professor, and became a full professor in 1989. During her time at the University of Illinois she was awarded the Harriet and
Charles Luckman Undergraduate Distinguished Teaching Award, served as an editor of The Journal of English and Germanic Philology, and was made a Fellow of the Huntington Library. Her publications at Illinois included The Map of Time: Seventeenth-Century English Literature and Ideas of Pattern in History in 1986 and Ceremony and Community from Herbert to Milton: Literature, Religion and Cultural Conflict in Seventeenth-Century English Literature in 1998. In 2004, having spent a year there as a visiting professor, Guibbory moved to Barnard College to take up a position as the Ann Whitney Olin Professor of English. During her time at Barnard she has been awarded a Guggenheim Fellowship and published The Cambridge Companion to John Donne in 2006. In 2010 she was awarded an honorary Doctor of Humane Letters from Iona College.

References

American academics of English literature
Living people
Year of birth missing (living people)